Richard van Emden is a British author and television documentary producer who specialises in the First World War.

He interviewed over 270 veterans of the Great War and has written 16 books on the subject including the autobiography of Harry Patch, "The Last Fighting Tommy". He has also worked on more than a dozen television programmes on the First World War, including "Britain’s Last Tommies," "Britain’s Boy Soldiers," the award-winning "The Roses of No Man’s Land" and "War Horse: The Real Story."

He lives in West London.

Bibliography

Footnotes

Notes

References

External links
 
 http://www.bbc.co.uk/nottingham/spotlight/2002/03/the_trench.shtml
 http://entertainment.timesonline.co.uk/tol/arts_and_entertainment/books/article380489.ece

1965 births
Living people
British non-fiction writers
British male writers
Historians of World War I
British military writers
British military historians
People educated at Reading Blue Coat School
Male non-fiction writers